The 2007 season was the San Diego Chargers' 38th in the National Football League (NFL) and their 48th overall. The team failed to equal their 14–2 2006 regular season record, As they went 5–5 under new head coach Norv Turner. However, they finished the regular season strongly, with six straight wins, an overall record of 11–5, and the AFC West title.  The Chargers went further in the playoffs than the previous year, but fell again to the New England Patriots, this time in the AFC Championship game. For the second consecutive season, star running back LaDainian Tomlinson led the NFL in rushing with 1,474 yards. In the offseason, the Chargers introduced a new logo, with the lightning bolt changing to yellow with bright blue and regular blue outlines. It would be their logo for 10 years.

Offseason

After a postseason loss to the New England Patriots, offensive and defensive coordinators Cam Cameron and Wade Phillips left for new coaching jobs with the Miami Dolphins and Dallas Cowboys respectively. Marty Schottenheimer, after originally being told he would stay as head coach, was fired in February. Replacing Schottenheimer was Norv Turner, who was signed to take over the helm later in the month. Turner, who installed the Chargers offensive set when he was their offensive coordinator in 2001, was selected to be the head coach largely because he was expected to maintain the offensive game plan that led the team to its best regular season record in team history. Turner also agreed with general manager A.J. Smith on the hiring of defensive coordinator Ted Cottrell, who had worked with Phillips when both were with the Buffalo Bills and later was the defensive coordinator with the Bills. Chicago Bears defensive coordinator Ron Rivera, who interviewed for the Chargers' head coaching job, was hired to coach the Chargers' linebackers instead.  Smith also re-signed Charger free agent offensive guard Kris Dielman to a six-year contract that will virtually guarantee him almost $17 million and put him around $40 million over the life of the deal. Linebacker Donnie Edwards was not offered a contract and signed with his former team, the Kansas City Chiefs. The Chargers released veteran wide receiver Keenan McCardell during the offseason along with safety Terrence Kiel.

Draft

The Chargers started out by making the 30th overall pick in the 2007 NFL Draft due to their 14–2 season in 2006. They selected Craig Davis out of Louisiana State University. In the second round, the Chargers made a trade with the Bears in order to move up and select safety Eric Weddle at slot 37#. He was selected as a possible replacement to Terrence Kiel, who was released earlier in the off-season following his arrest on drug charges during the 2006 season. The Chargers exchanged their second round selection in 2007 as well as third round, fifth round and 2008 third round selection. The Chargers also selected linebacker Anthony Waters from Clemson University, who missed his senior season due to a leg injury.

Roster

Preseason

Schedule

Regular season

Schedule

Standings

Regular season results

Week 1: vs. Chicago Bears

The Chargers began their 2007 campaign at home as they matched up their offensive firepower against the Chicago Bears and their rock-hard defense.  In this defensive slugfest, the Bears held RB LaDainian Tomlinson, the previous year's league MVP, to just 12 yards rushing on 11 attempts, while getting a 27-yard field goal by kicker Robbie Gould in the second quarter.  This game also marked the first time since 2001 that the Chargers were shut out in the first half.  In the third quarter, San Diego started to bounce back as Tomlinson threw his 7th career touchdown pass to TE Antonio Gates from 17 yards out.  In the fourth, Tomlinson delivered the final blow with a 7-yard TD run.

With the win, the Chargers began their season at 1–0.

Scoring summary
Q2 – CHI – 14:13 – Robbie Gould 27-yard FG (CHI 3–0)
Q3 – SD – 0:45 – 17-yard TD pass from LaDainian Tomlinson to Antonio Gates (Nate Kaeding kick) (SD 7–3)
Q4 – SD – 9:09 – LaDainian Tomlinson 7-yard TD run (Kaeding kick) (SD 14–3)

Week 2: at New England Patriots

Following their low-scoring home win over the Bears, the Chargers flew to Gillette Stadium for a Week 2 Sunday night fight against the New England Patriots, in a rematch of last year's AFC Divisional game. In the first quarter, San Diego trailed early as the Patriots took their opening drive and ended it with QB Tom Brady completing a 7-yard TD pass to TE Benjamin Watson. Afterwards, New England continued its opening assault as Brady completed a 23-yard TD pass to WR Randy Moss. In the second quarter, the Chargers continued to show last week's first half struggles as Patriots kicker Stephen Gostkowski getting a 24-yard field goal, while LB Adalius Thomas intercepted one of QB Philip Rivers' passes and returned it 65 yards for a touchdown.

In the third quarter, the Chargers finally managed to score as Rivers completed a 1-yard TD pass to FB Lorenzo Neal, but New England responded with Brady and Moss hooking up with each other again on a 24-yard TD pass.  In the fourth quarter, San Diego tried to fight back with Rivers completing a 12-yard TD pass to TE Antonio Gates, but the Patriots ended the game with RB Sammy Morris getting a 3-yard TD run.

RB LaDainian Tomlinson was a non-factor, as he was only able to muster 43 yards on 18 carries.  At this point, he was off to a rough start, totalling only 68 rushing yards in the first two games.

With the loss, the Chargers fell to 1–1.

Week 3: at Green Bay Packers

Trying to rebound from their primetime road loss to the Patriots, the Chargers flew to Lambeau Field for Week 3, as they played an interconference game with the Green Bay Packers.  In the first quarter, San Diego struck first with QB Philip Rivers completing a 27-yard TD pass to WR Vincent Jackson. The Packers responded with kicker Mason Crosby getting a 28-yard field goal.  In the second quarter, Green Bay took the lead with QB Brett Favre completing a pair of 5-yard TD passes, one to WR Donald Driver and one to TE Bubba Franks.  The Chargers responded with Rivers completing a 9-yard TD pass to WR Craig Davis.

In the third quarter, the Chargers took the lead with Rivers completing a 21-yard TD pass to RB LaDainian Tomlinson for the only score of the period.  However, in the fourth quarter, the Packers retook the lead with Favre's record-tying 57-yard TD pass to WR Greg Jennings, along with RB Brandon Jackson getting a 1-yard TD run.  San Diego tried to come back, as kicker Nate Kaeding got a 44-yard field goal.  However, the onside kick failed with Green Bay holding on to win.

Notable: Philip Rivers broke a Chargers record completing 15 consecutive passes in the first half. 
With the loss, the Chargers fell to 1–2.

Week 4: vs. Kansas City Chiefs

Trying to snap a two-game skid, the Chargers went home for an AFC West duel with the Kansas City Chiefs. In the first quarter, San Diego's struggling offense found some life with kicker Nate Kaeding getting a 24-yard field goal, while RB LaDainian Tomlinson got a 5-yard TD run. In the second quarter, the Chargers increased its lead with Kaeding kicking a 51-yard field goal.  The Chiefs answered with a 25-yard field goal by Dave Rayner. Afterwards, San Diego ended the half with Kaeding getting a 38-yard field goal.  In the third quarter, the Chargers lost their lead, with Kansas City getting a 41-yard field goal from Rayner and QB Damon Huard completing a 22-yard TD pass to TE Tony Gonzalez.  Even worse, San Diego ended up losing in the fourth quarter with Huard completing a 51-yard TD pass to WR Dwayne Bowe, along with CB Tyron Brackenridge returning a fumble 50 yards for a touchdown.

With their third-straight loss, the Chargers fell to 1–3.

One of the few positives from the game, Tomlinson finally got his first 100-yard game of the year, with 132 rushing yards on 20 carries.

Week 5: at Denver Broncos

Hoping to rebound from their embarrassing divisional home loss to the Chiefs, the Chargers flew to Invesco Field at Mile High for a Week 5 divisional duel with the Denver Broncos.  In the first quarter, San Diego got off to a fast start with QB Philip Rivers getting a 2-yard TD run.  Immediately afterwards on the ensuing kickoff, rookie LB Brandon Siler returned a fumble 23 yards for a touchdown.  In the second quarter, the Chargers increased its lead with kicker Nate Kaeding getting a 26-yard field goal.  Afterwards, the Broncos got their only score of the game with kicker Jason Elam getting a 30-yard field goal.  San Diego ended the half with Kaeding nailing a 45-yard field goal.

In the third quarter, the Chargers continued their offensive revival with Rivers completing a 9-yard TD pass to TE Antonio Gates and a 15-yard TD pass to WR Vincent Jackson.  In the fourth quarter, RB Michael Turner helped San Diego seal their easy victory with a 74-yard TD run.

With the win, the Chargers improved to 2–3.  The win also marked San Diego's first back-to-back wins in Denver since 1967 and 1968.

Week 6: vs. Oakland Raiders

Coming off of their blowout divisional road win over the Broncos, the Chargers went home for a Week 6 divisional duel with the Oakland Raiders.  In the first quarter, the Chargers came out striking with RB LaDainian Tomlinson got a 3-yard and a 27-yard TD run.  In the second quarter, the Raiders managed to get on the board with LB Thomas Howard returning an interception 66 yards for a touchdown, along with the only score of the period.  In the third quarter, San Diego went back to work with Tomlinson getting a 13-yard TD run for the only score of the period.  In the fourth quarter, Oakland tried to salvage a comeback as QB Daunte Culpepper threw a 1-yard TD pass to TE Zach Miller.  However, the Chargers sealed the victory a 41-yard TD run by Tomlinson.

With the win, the Chargers entered their bye week at 3–3.

Week 8: vs. Houston Texans

After speculation about the games location because of the ongoing California wildfires, it was confirmed on October 26, 2007, that Qualcomm Stadium would no longer be an evacuation site for San Diego residents, with most of the evacuees moved to Del Mar. Before, sites in the Phoenix area were being considered to host the game, as well as Houston's Reliant Stadium, and also the Dallas Cowboys’ Texas Stadium. Before the game a special tribute was paid to at the stadium for the fire fighters, National Guard, and volunteers who assisted in fighting the fires and helping the evacuees. Governor Arnold Schwarzenegger attended the game and flipped the coin, which the Chargers won. With an emotional charge from both the players and fans, as well as some victims, the Chargers played one of the best games of their season. Philip Rivers threw 3 touchdown passes despite only throwing 11 passes. Two TDs went to tight end Antonio Gates, and the remainder went to newly acquired wideout Chris Chambers, who was just traded from the Miami Dolphins a two weeks earlier and played his first game as a Charger (due to San Diego's bye week). However, that performance was second to second-year corner Antonio Cromartie, who performance included two interceptions, and two defensive touchdowns. He had a 70-yard INT return for a score, and the other was a complicated snap where the Texans snapped the ball over punter Matt Turk’s head, and the ball fell into the end zone. Quickly having to recover, Turk missed grabbing the ball and it fell into the hands of Cromartie, easily scoring. The Chargers won, 35–10 in a home blowout, which was, in the quote of LaDainian Tomlinson, "one for the fans.”

With this win, the Chargers improved to 4–3.

Week 9: at Minnesota Vikings

After an emotional home win over the Texans, the Chargers flew to the Hubert H. Humphrey Metrodome for a Week 9 interconference duel with the Minnesota Vikings.  In the first quarter, San Diego struck first with RB LaDainian Tomlinson getting a 1-yard TD run.  The Vikings responded with RB Adrian Peterson getting a 1-yard TD run.  In the second quarter, there was no scoring until the final play of the half, as CB Antonio Cromartie returned a missed field goal 109 yards for a touchdown, the longest play in NFL history.

In the third quarter, things started to get grim for San Diego as Minnesota took the lead with Peterson getting a 64-yard TD run and QB Brooks Bollinger completing a 40-yard TD pass to WR Sidney Rice.  In the fourth quarter, the Chargers tried to come back as kicker Nate Kaeding nailed a 36-yard field goal. The Vikings sealed the win with Peterson getting a 46-yard TD run, along with RB Chester Taylor getting a 2-yard TD run. LaDainian Tomlinson, despite getting only 1 rushing touchdown, managed to surpass Jim Brown for most career rushing touchdowns with his 107th TD.

With the loss, San Diego fell to 4–4.

During the game, Minnesota rookie running back Adrian Peterson broke the NFL single-game rushing record with 296 yards rushing on 30 carries.

Week 10: vs. Indianapolis Colts

After an upset loss to the Vikings, the Chargers faced the defending Super Bowl champions in San Diego following their first loss of the season to the New England Patriots. Darren Sproles return the opening kickoff 89 yards for a touchdown. After a Nate Kaeding field goal, Sproles returned a punt 45 yards for his second special teams touchdown of the game with less than 6 minutes left in the first quarter. The PAT snap wasn't held and the PAT failed. Peyton Manning threw four interceptions in the first quarter alone. In the second quarter the Chargers put together a 45-yard drive resulting in a 4-yard touchdown run by LaDainian Tomlinson. Manning was able to score a touchdown to Reggie Wayne leaving the score 23–7 at halftime.

After a scoreless third quarter Manning threw a touchdown to Kenton Keith and the Colts were able to complete the two-point conversion. On third and 10 from the Chargers 8-yard line, Philip Rivers went back to pass and the ball slipped out of his hand and into the end zone. Colts linebacker Gary Brackett picked up the ball for a touchdown with 14:28 to play. The Colts failed the two-point conversion. With six minutes left in the game Rivers threw an interception to rookie Clint Session. In the red zone the Colts picked up the first down, but the booth reviewed the play and it was determined to be fourth and inches. The Colts intended to go for the first down, but a false start penalty by Ben Utecht moved them five yards back, and instead they went for the field goal. With 1:31 left the Colts lined up the kicking team for a game-winning field goal, but Adam Vinatieri’s 29-yard kick was wide right. The Chargers ran down the clock and the Colts had 22 seconds to score, but the game ended with Clinton Hart intercepting the ball with time expiring for the Chargers win. Manning set a franchise record by throwing six interceptions in one game (3 to Antonio Cromartie and one apiece to Clinton Hart, Matt Wilhelm, and Shaun Philips).

Both team had significant injuries coming into the game. For the Chargers CB Quentin Jammer and DE Luis Castillo were out of the game. The Colts had 10 players out of the game including TE Dallas Clark, WR Marvin Harrison, and OT Tony Ugoh. Dwight Freeney left the game with an injured foot.

With the win, the Chargers improved to 5–4. With Kansas City losing to Denver, San Diego retained first place in the AFC West.

Week 11 at Jacksonville Jaguars

Coming off their win over the Colts, the Chargers flew to Jacksonville Municipal Stadium for a Week 11 intraconference duel with the Jacksonville Jaguars. In the first quarter, San Diego trailed early as Jaguars kicker Josh Scobee managed to get a 48-yard field goal, along with RB Maurice Jones-Drew getting a 1-yard TD run. In the second quarter, the Chargers got on the board with kicker Nate Kaeding getting a 23-yard field goal.  However, Jacksonville responded with QB David Garrard completing a 36-yard TD pass to WR Reggie Williams.

In the third quarter, San Diego responded with RB LaDainian Tomlinson getting a 6-yard TD run, yet the Jaguars answered with Garrard completing a 1-yard TD pass to TE Marcedes Lewis.  In the fourth quarter, the Chargers tried to make a comeback as QB Philip Rivers completed a 24-yard TD pass to TE Antonio Gates.  But it was too-little too-late, as Jacksonville's defense held on to win.

With the loss, San Diego fell to 5–5.

Week 12: vs. Baltimore Ravens

Hoping to rebound from their road loss to the Jaguars, the Chargers went home for a Week 12 duel with the Baltimore Ravens.  After a scoreless first quarter, San Diego struck first with kicker Nate Kaeding getting a 27-yard field goal.  Afterwards, the Ravens took the lead with RB Willis McGahee getting a 1-yard TD run.  The Chargers regained the lead with QB Philip Rivers completing a 35-yard TD pass to TE Antonio Gates (with a failed PAT), Kaeding kicking a 46-yard field goal, Rivers completing a 5-yard TD pass to WR Chris Chambers, and Kaeding kicking a 41-yard field goal.

In the third quarter, San Diego increased its lead with Rivers and Gates hooking up with each other again on a 25-yard TD pass.  Baltimore managed one final score as Ravens QB Kyle Boller completed a 13-yard TD pass to FB Le'Ron McClain.  In the fourth quarter, the Chargers sealed the win with Kaeding nailing a 41-yard field goal.

With the win, the Chargers improved to 6–5.

RB LaDainian Tomlinson (24 carries for 77 yards) became the fourth-fastest player and the 23rd player in NFL history to get 10,000 career rushing yards.

Week 13: at Kansas City Chiefs

Coming off their home win over the Ravens, the Chargers flew to Arrowhead Stadium for a Week 13 AFC West rematch with the Kansas City Chiefs. In the first quarter, San Diego trailed early as Chiefs kicker John Carney managed to get a 38-yard field goal. Afterwards, the Chargers got on the board with kicker Nate Kaeding nailing a 25-yard field goal.  In the second quarter, Kansas City regained the lead as QB Damon Huard completed a 2-yard TD pass to DE Jared Allen.  Afterwards, San Diego tied the game again as QB Philip Rivers completed a 38-yard TD pass to WR Vincent Jackson.

In the second quarter, the Chargers pulled away as RB LaDainian Tomlinson got a 31-yard TD run in the third quarter and a 28-yard TD run in the fourth quarter.  His two rushing touchdowns helped him surpass Walter Payton for third place on the NFL's all-time rushing touchdowns list.  The game also gave him his 3rd-straight 100-yard game against the Chiefs.  Also, CB Antonio Cromartie recorded 2 INT to bring his league leading total to 8.

With this win, San Diego improved to 7–5.

Week 14: at Tennessee Titans

Coming off their divisional road win over the Chiefs, the Chargers flew to LP Field for a Week 14 intraconference duel with the Tennessee Titans. In the first quarter, San Diego trailed early as Titans kicker Rob Bironas managed to get a 44-yard field goal for the only score of the half.

In the third quarter, the Chargers got on the board as kicker Nate Kaeding nailed a 20-yard field goal, yet Tennessee responded with RB Chris Brown getting a 7-yard TD run. In the fourth quarter, the Titans increased their lead with RB LenDale White getting a 7-yard TD run.  San Diego tied the game with QB Philip Rivers completing a 7-yard TD pass to RB LaDainian Tomlinson and a 2-yard TD pass to TE Antonio Gates. In overtime, the Chargers got the win with Tomlinson getting the game-winning 16-yard TD run.

With the win, the Chargers improved to 8–5.

For Tomlinson, it was his 3rd overtime touchdown (the most in NFL history).

For CB Antonio Cromartie, his lone interception gave him 9 on the year, tying the franchise single-season record set by Charlie McNeil in 1961.

Week 15: vs. Detroit Lions

Coming off their overtime road win over the Titans, the Chargers went home for a Week 15 interconference duel with the Detroit Lions. The Chargers struck first with RB LaDainian Tomlinson getting a 6-yard TD run, Kicker Nate Kaeding getting a 22-yard field goal, and Tomlinson getting a 2-yard TD run. In the second quarter, San Diego continued its domination with Kaeding getting a 22-yard field goal and LB Shaun Phillips returning an interception 18 yards for a touchdown. The Lions got on the board with QB Jon Kitna completing a 9-yard TD pass to WR Brandon Middleton. The Chargers ended the scoring for the half with QB Philip Rivers completing a 1-yard TD run to TE Brandon Manumaleuna.

In the third quarter, San Diego continued its annihilation with RB Darren Sproles getting a 1-yard TD run and Kaeding nailing a 45-yard field goal. Detroit got its final points of the game as Kitna completed a 17-yard TD pass to WR Shaun McDonald. In the fourth quarter, the Chargers ended their day with Sproles getting an 11-yard TD run.

With this win, not only did the Chargers improve to 9–5, but they also clinched their second-straight AFC West title.

For Darren Sproles (25 attempts for 122 yards and 2 touchdowns) and LaDainian Tomlinson (15 attempts for 116 yards and 2 touchdowns), they became the first RB duo in franchise history to both get 100 rushing yards in the same game.  Also, Tomlinson ended this part of his career with 127 career touchdowns, surpassing Jim Brown for 7th All-Time.

Also, CB Antonio Cromartie received his 10th interception.

Week 16: vs. Denver Broncos

Trying to make it 5 straight wins and stay in contention for the No. 3 seed in the AFC playoffs, the Chargers continued their domination over the Denver Broncos on Christmas Eve. Not only did they stop them from scoring a touchdown for the second time this season they also made it 4 straight victories over Denver.

The game started off inauspiciously for the Broncos when Denver QB Jay Cutler fumbled the ball leading to a 40-yard K Nate Kaeding field goal for San Diego, and after a 3 and out, the Chargers gave the ball to RB LaDainian Tomlinson for a 17-yard TD run.

The second quarter was relatively quiet as 2 Kaeding Field goals (23-yards & 29-yards) gave the Chargers a 16-point lead going into halftime.

In the third quarter San Diego QB Philip Rivers and WR Chris Chambers hooked up on a 14-yard pass and catch to make the score 23–0. Denver finally began to move offensively until a tipped pass was intercepted by San Diego SS Clinton Hart, but some defensive miscues including a San Diego QB Billy Volek fumble led to a 23-yard field goal by Denver K Jason Elam.

In the fourth quarter the defense stepped up for the Chargers on two fourth down plays and a San Diego CB Quentin Jammer interception sealed the victory for San Diego.

The result guaranteed that a San Diego win at Oakland would secure the No. 3 seed in the AFC playoffs.

The win in Denver at home made San Diego only the second team in NFL history to shut out every opponent at home in the first quarter, outscoring opponents 81–0.

With the win, the Chargers improved to 10–5.

Week 17: at Oakland Raiders

Coming off their Christmas Eve victory of the Broncos, the Chargers ended the regular season at McAfee Coliseum for a Week 17 AFC West rematch with the Oakland Raiders. In the first quarter, San Diego struck first as QB Philip Rivers completing a 7-yard TD pass to RB LaDainian Tomlinson. The Raiders responded with RB Dominic Rhodes getting a 1-yard TD run. In the second quarter, the Chargers regained the lead with Rivers completing a 19-yard TD pass to WR Chris Chambers. Oakland ended the half with kicker Sebastian Janikowski getting a 53-yard field goal.

In the third quarter, the Chargers increased their lead with kicker Nate Kaeding getting a 36-yard field goal, along with rookie LB Jyles Tucker recovering a Raider fumble in the endzone for a touchdown.  Oakland responded with QB JaMarcus Russell completing a 32-yard TD pass to WR Jerry Porter.  In the fourth quarter, San Diego sealed the win with Kaeding nailing a 31-yard and a 24-yard field goal.

With the win, not only did the Chargers close out their regular season at 11–5, but they also secured the AFC's No. 3 seed.

Postseason

AFC Wild Card Playoff (Sunday January 6, 2008): vs. Tennessee Titans

Entering the playoffs as the AFC's No. 3 seed, the Chargers began their playoff run at home against the sixth-seeded Tennessee Titans, in a rematch of Week 14, which saw San Diego trail early, then rally to tie the game in the fourth quarter and win in overtime.

In the first half, the Chargers trailed early as Titans kicker Rob Bironas managed to get a 30-yard field goal in the first quarter and a 44-yard field goal in the second quarter.  In the third quarter, the Chargers rallied to take the lead with kicker Nate Kaeding nailing a 20-yard field goal, along with QB Philip Rivers completing a 25-yard TD pass to WR Vincent Jackson.  In the fourth quarter, San Diego pulled away with RB LaDainian Tomlinson getting a 1-yard TD run. However, San Diego Chargers tight end Antonio Gates had to leave the game with a right toe injury earlier in the game, and never returned.

With the win, not only did the Chargers improve their overall record to 12–5, but they also gave the franchise its very first playoff win since the 1994–95 AFC Championship Game which led them to Super Bowl XXIX. The team advanced to the AFC Divisional Playoff.

AFC Divisional Playoff (Sunday, January 13, 2008): at Indianapolis Colts

Coming off their wild card home win over the Titans, the Chargers flew to the RCA Dome for their AFC Divisional duel with the second-seeded/defending Super Bowl champion Indianapolis Colts, in a rematch of Week 10. In the first scoring play, Peyton Manning threw a TD to Dallas Clark for 25 yards. LaDainian Tomlinson was injured on a running play and despite an attempt to return to action later in the first half, he did not return to the game. Philip Rivers then threw a pass to Vincent Jackson for San Diego's first TD of the game. Adam Vinatieri made a 46-yard FG to put the Colts up 10–7. Antonio Cromartie intercepted Peyton Manning at the end of the first half and ran it 89 yards for a touchdown; however, the play was called back on a dubious holding call by Phil Luckett. The second half began with Rivers tossing a pass to Chris Chambers for 30 yards. At 3:19 of the third quarter, Manning completed a pass for Reggie Wayne for 9 yards. Rivers managed to complete a 56-yard pass to Darren Sproles for a touchdown. On that play, Rivers injured his leg and did not return to the game. Billy Volek replaced Rivers at quarterback. Starting the fourth quarter, Manning threw a TD pass to Anthony Gonzalez for 55 yards. Volek engineered a long drive culminating in a 1-yard sneak for a TD putting the Chargers up for good.

The Colts had two late opportunities to score on separate drives. On the first drive, the Colts faced a 4th down from inside the Charger 20-yard line. They decided against a field goal which still would have left them down by 1 point. Trying for the touchdown, Peyton Manning was hurried by a blitzing Shawne Merriman as his throw came up short. The Chargers took over on downs but failed to get a first down. After a long punt by Mike Scifres, the Colts had less than 2 minutes to try to win the game. Once again, the Chargers defense stifled the Colts, taking over on downs with seconds to play.

With the win, the team improved their overall record to 13–5. The team advanced to the AFC Championship Game.  There were a total of 7 lead changes throughout the game.

AFC Championship Game (Sunday, January 20, 2008) at New England Patriots

After squeaking out their victory over Indianapolis, San Diego then traveled to Foxborough, Massachusetts to take on the New England Patriots in the AFC Championship Game in a rematch of Week 2.  The Patriots were undefeated going into this game, at 17–0. Despite the Patriots being heavily favored to win by a large margin and advance to Super Bowl XLII, the game remained tight throughout, as the Chargers kept the score a 14–12 through the third quarter. Philip Rivers played through a torn ACL.  LaDainian Tomlinson left early in the 1st quarter with another injury, never to return. Hampered by these key players' absences, the Chargers were unable to find the end zone the entire game. All twelve of their points were field goals.

Notes and references

San Diego
San Diego Chargers seasons
AFC West championship seasons
San Diego